Reginaldo de Lizárraga, O.P. (1535 – 10 November 1609) was a Roman Catholic prelate who served as Bishop of Paraguay (1609)
and Bishop of Concepción in Chile (1598–1609).

Biography
Reginaldo de Lizárraga was born in Lizarraga, Spain and ordained a priest in the Order of Preachers.
On 31 August 1598, he was confirmed by Pope Clement VIII as Bishop of Concepción and installed in December 1602.
On 24 October 1599, he was consecrated bishop by Toribio Alfonso de Mogrovejo, Archbishop of Lima. 
On 20 July 1609, he was appointed during the papacy of Pope Paul V as Bishop of Paraguay.
He served as Bishop of Paraguay until his death on 10 November 1609.

References

External links and additional sources
 (for Chronology of Bishops) 
 (for Chronology of Bishops) 
 (for Chronology of Bishops) 
 (for Chronology of Bishops) 
 (for Chronology of Bishops)  

16th-century Roman Catholic bishops in Chile
17th-century Roman Catholic bishops in Paraguay
Bishops appointed by Pope Clement VIII
Bishops appointed by Pope Paul V
1535 births
1609 deaths
Dominican bishops
17th-century Roman Catholic bishops in Chile
Roman Catholic bishops of Paraguay
Roman Catholic bishops of Concepción